Jean-Julien Rojer and Johan Brunström won in the final 6–3, 6–4, against Pablo Cuevas and Horacio Zeballos.

Seeds

Draw

Draw

References
 Doubles Draw

Challenger ATP Iquique